Givira morosa is a moth in the family Cossidae. It is found in Costa Rica.

The wingspan is about 37 mm. The forewings are steel-grey, reticulated with black brown. The hindwings are whitish, reticulated with brown. The inner margin is brownish.

References

Natural History Museum Lepidoptera generic names catalog

Givira
Moths described in 1911